The Catholic Action Center ( or KVC) was a Catholic Action organization active in interwar Lithuania from 1919 to 1940. It was an umbrella organization uniting and coordinating activities of various Roman Catholic societies and organizations in Lithuania.

Activities
The center was officially registered on 20 December 1919. It published a few books and reproduction of paintings. Further publishing activities were taken over by the Catholic Press Office established in 1921. Activities of the Catholic Action Center intensified after the coup d'état of December 1926. The center adopted the Italian model of Catholic Action which relied on four key organizations for Catholic men, women, male youth, and female youth. In 1927, the center organized its first conference which became an annual event. In 1928–1940, it published weekly newspaper . In 1938, it established a fund to support the arts; this fund awarded two prizes in literature and one prize in art.

In 1931, the ruling Lithuanian Nationalist Union reduced the Faculty of Theology of Vytautas Magnus University and laid off 18 professors. This prompted Lithuanian clergy to revive ideas about a separate Catholic university. The Catholic Action Center was involved in organizing this university which was approved by the Holy See in June 1932, but the Lithuanian Nationalist Union postponed it indefinitely.

The center became a gathering place for the activists of the Lithuanian Christian Democratic Party which faced pressure and persecution by the Lithuanian Nationalist Union. The government was reluctant to take actions against the Catholic Action Center as its protection was guaranteed in the agreements between Lithuania and the Holy See.

The center was closed on 17 July 1940, shortly after the Soviet occupation of Lithuania in June 1940.

Structure
The center was governed by a 13-member board. Six members were elected by the general meeting of center's members and other six plus the spiritual leader were elected by the Lithuanian bishops. The center divided its activities in regions that were based on dioceses and districts based on parishes.

Membership
In 1938, the center united 23 different Lithuanian Catholic organizations, including:
 Catholic children's organization 
 Catholic youth organization Ateitis
 Labor union 
 Lithuanian section of Caritas
 
 Charitable Fund of Leo XIII
 Catholic Organizations' Union
 Lithuanian Catholic Teachers' Organization
 Lithuanian Catholic Women's Union
 Lithuanian Catholic Men's Union
 Book publishing Society of Saint Casimir
 Educational Žiburys Society

Chairmen and board members
The center was chaired by:
 Aleksandras Stulginskis
 
 Antanas Tumėnas
 Teofilius Matulionis
 Jonas Pankauskas

Other board members included Stasys Šalkauskis, Pranas Būčys, Zenonas Ivinskis.

References

1919 establishments in Lithuania
Organizations established in 1919
1940 disestablishments in Lithuania
Organizations disestablished in 1940
Catholic advocacy groups
Catholic Church in Lithuania
Clubs and societies in Lithuania